Tahira Naqvi (Punjabi, ; 20 August 1956 – 2 June 1982) was a Pakistani actress who began her career in 70s and worked until her death at the age of 25. She became popular by appearing in several television series and two films in her career spanning a few years. She was known as Mistress of Emotions because she portrayed roles of sentiment, nostalgia and despondent in dramas. Tahira along with Uzma Gillani, Khalida Riyasat and Roohi Bano dominated Pakistan's television screens during the 1970s and 1980s.

Early life
Tahira Naqvi was born in Daska, Pakistan on August 20, 1956. Tahira completed her early studies from Convent of Jesus and Mary, Lahore and later she graduated from Government Girls College.

Career
She began her career as a television actress. Tahira also worked at Radio Pakistan in 1974 and she worked in fifty television dramas. Tahira did a lead role in Hash along with Talat Hussain which was written by playwright and film director Sarmad Sehbai. She acted in television serials Zindagi Bandagi (1978), Waris (1979) and Dehleez (1981). She also won the PTV Award for Best Actress. Tahira also appeared in two films Badaltey Mosam (1980) and Mian Biwi Razi (1982) but her main focus was on television. She became a famous name in early 80s and received extensive praise for her work.

Personal life
Tahira was married and she had one daughter named Asma Ahmed Khan.

Illness and death

Tahira was daigonsed with cancer and was admitted to Combined Military Hospital Rawalpindi for treatment. On 2 June 1982, she died at Combined Military Hospital in Rawalpindi at the age of 25 after battling with cancer and was buried in the compound's graveyard at the tomb of Mian Mir in Lahore.

Filmography

Television series
 Hash
 Dastak Na Do
 Zanjeer
 Madan-e-Mohabbat
 Zindagi Bandagi
 Manzil Hai Kahan
 Khana Badosh
 Waris
 Ek Haqeeqat Ek Fasana
 Dehleez
 Eshaan
 Siah Kiran
 Aur Drame
 Sayeen Aur Psychiatrist

Telefilm
 Madawa

Film
 Badaltey Mosam
 Mian Biwi Razi

Honour
In 2021 on August 16th the Government of Pakistan named a street and intersection after her in Lahore.

Awards and nominations

References

External links
 

1956 births
20th-century Pakistani actresses
Pakistani film actresses
Pakistani television actresses
1982 deaths
People from Sialkot District
Punjabi people
Pakistani radio personalities
PTV Award winners
Actresses from Lahore
Punjabi women
Radio personalities from Lahore
Actresses in Urdu cinema